Zardeh Savar (also Romanized as Zardeh Savār; also known as Zardeh Savār-e Sarkeshtī) is a village in Itivand-e Jonubi Rural District, Kakavand District, Delfan County, Lorestan Province, Iran. At the 2006 census, its population was 152, in 25 families.

References 

Towns and villages in Delfan County